Hartlepool Borough Council elections usually take place for a third of the council, three years out of every four. Hartlepool Borough Council is the local authority for the unitary authority of Hartlepool in County Durham, England. Until 1 April 1996 it was a non-metropolitan district in Cleveland. Between 2002 and 2013 the council was led by a directly elected mayor.

Political control
An earlier municipal borough of Hartlepool existed from 1850 until 1967 covering the old town, whilst neighbouring West Hartlepool was a county borough (making it independent from Durham County Council) from 1902 to 1967. West Hartlepool and Hartlepool merged into a single county borough called Hartlepool in 1967. Under the Local Government Act 1972 a non-metropolitan district called Hartlepool was established, covering a larger area than the previous borough, and Hartlepool was transferred to the new county of Cleveland. The first election to the reconstituted Hartlepool Borough Council was held in 1973, initially operating as a shadow authority before coming into its powers on 1 April 1974. County-level services were provided by Cleveland County Council until its abolition in 1996, when Hartlepool became a unitary authority. Political control of the council since 1973 has been held by the following parties:

Non-metropolitan district

Unitary authority

Leadership
Prior to 2002, political leadership was provided by the leader of the council. The leaders from 1999 to 2002 were:

In 2002 the council changed to having a directly elected mayor. The mayor from 2002 to 2013 was:

In 2013 the council abolished the post of directly elected mayor, and political leadership was once again provided by the leader of the council. The leaders since 2013 have been:

Council elections

Non-metropolitan district elections
1973 Hartlepool Borough Council election
1976 Hartlepool Borough Council election (New ward boundaries)
1979 Hartlepool Borough Council election
1980 Hartlepool Borough Council election
1982 Hartlepool Borough Council election
1983 Hartlepool Borough Council election
1984 Hartlepool Borough Council election
1986 Hartlepool Borough Council election
1987 Hartlepool Borough Council election
1988 Hartlepool Borough Council election
1990 Hartlepool Borough Council election
1991 Hartlepool Borough Council election
1992 Hartlepool Borough Council election
1994 Hartlepool Borough Council election

Unitary authority elections
1995 Hartlepool Borough Council election
1996 Hartlepool Borough Council election
1998 Hartlepool Borough Council election
1999 Hartlepool Borough Council election
2000 Hartlepool Borough Council election
2002 Hartlepool Borough Council election
2003 Hartlepool Borough Council election
2004 Hartlepool Borough Council election (New ward boundaries)
2006 Hartlepool Borough Council election
2007 Hartlepool Borough Council election
2008 Hartlepool Borough Council election
2010 Hartlepool Borough Council election
2011 Hartlepool Borough Council election
2012 Hartlepool Borough Council election (New ward boundaries)
2014 Hartlepool Borough Council election
2015 Hartlepool Borough Council election
2016 Hartlepool Borough Council election
2018 Hartlepool Borough Council election
2019 Hartlepool Borough Council election
2021 Hartlepool Borough Council election

Mayoral elections
On 18 October 2001 there was a referendum on whether Hartlepool should have a directly elected mayor. The referendum saw a narrow vote in favour with 10,667 yes votes and 10,294 no votes on a turnout of 31%. The first election in 2002 saw an independent candidate Stuart Drummond elected and he has been re-elected in both the 2005 and 2009 elections.

Hartlepool mayoral election, 2002
Hartlepool mayoral election, 2005
Hartlepool mayoral election, 2009

By-election results

References

External links
Hartlepool Borough Council
By-election results 

 
Unitary authority elections in England
Politics of the Borough of Hartlepool
Council elections in County Durham
Council elections in Cleveland